Tonko Lonza (29 September 1930 – 23 December 2018) was a Croatian actor. He appeared in more than thirty films since 1959.

Filmography

Awards
 Vladimir Nazor Award for Life Achievement in Theatre (1992)

References

External links 

1930 births
2018 deaths
People from Dubrovnik
Croatian male film actors